Rachel Matkin (born in 1975 in Fraser Canyon, British Columbia, Canada) is a Canadian country music artist. Matkin first began performing at the age of thirteen with her father Dave and her brothers Seth and Judd in The Matkin Family Band. They opened for Ian Tyson, Dwight Yoakam, Patricia Conroy, Lisa Brokop, The Moffats and Gary Fjellgaard. At age fourteen, she won the British Columbia Country Music Association (BCCMA) Junior Vocalist contest.

Matkin recorded one studio album for Cross Country Records, 1995's Living Beyond Our Dreams. This album produced five chart singles for her on the Canadian country music charts, of which the highest was the No. 18-peaking "So, So Long." At the 1996 BCCMA Awards, Living Beyond Our Dreams was named Album of the Year. Matkin also won the Ray McAuley Horizon Award. She caught the attention of MCA Records, who signed her to a distribution deal. At the 1997 Juno Awards, Matkin was nominated for Best Country Female Vocalist. In 2006, after nine years out of the spotlight, Matkin joined the country music group Steelewater.

Discography

Albums

Singles

References

External links
Official Site

Canadian women country singers
Living people
MCA Records artists
1975 births
21st-century Canadian women singers